Bill Day is an American cartoonist best known for his syndicated editorial cartoons. Day has won numerous industry awards, and has also been involved in controversy over his opposition to the National Rifle Association and advocacy of gun control, and over his reuse of his own previously drawn material.

Career
Day attended the University of Florida, where he studied political science. It was at this time that he first began drawing political cartoons.

Day has won the Robert F. Kennedy Journalism Award twice (in 1985, and in 2010), the National Cartoonists Society's award for best editorial cartoon in 1996, and several other industry awards.

Day's cartoons are syndicated nationally and internationally by Daryl Cagle's company Cagle Cartoons. After being laid-off by the Commercial Appeal in Memphis, Day struggled with odd jobs and nearly lost his home. Cagle launched an Indiegogo campaign to help Day, and supporters contributed $42,264 in support of the cartoonist.

Position on gun control

A recurring subject in Day's cartoons is gun control in America. He has drawn many cartoons advocating the need for more gun control and criticizing the National Rifle Association (NRA).

On September 18, 2013, in reference to the Washington Navy Yard shooting, Rep. Steve Cohen (D-Tenn.) tweeted one of Day's anti-NRA cartoons, which featured a gun with the words "NRA" along with the U.S. Capital and Washington Monument attached to it. The cartoon and tweets drew an angry response from the right, including Fox News host Bill O'Reilly, who called the tweets "despicable" and said Cohen was trying to "exploit the mass murder for political reasons."

"Bill Day is one of the great cartoonists, and is one of my friends and constituents. He’s been doing a series on gun violence and how it’s affected America," Cohen said on MSNBC. "I wanted to get Bill Day’s cartoon out there in the marketplace of ideas, and I think there definitely is a connection between the NRA and the continuing gun culture that we have."

Re-use of art and plagiarism accusations
Day has been criticized for his tendency to reuse his previously drawn comics with only slight alterations to make them topical, but his fans consider it a tempest in a teapot. Day was also accused of plagiarism in January 2013 when he used a computer generated image of a gun taken from the website deviantArt in one of his comics without crediting or getting the permission of the original creator. Cagle said that Day was not aware of the origins of the image and mistakenly believed it to be a photograph. Day said he pulled the cartoon when the mistake he made was realized, replaced it, and it had never been published. He also said that the Poynter Institute, which investigates journalism ethics, dismissed the accusations after looking into the incident. Cagle apologized to the original artist on Day's behalf.

References

External links
 Bill Day's cartoon archive
 NCS Awards

Living people
Year of birth missing (living people)
American editorial cartoonists
University of Florida alumni